The Benwood Foundation is a charitable foundation created in 1944 by George Hunter in honor of his uncle, Benjamin Thomas who pioneered the Coca-Cola bottling industry and founded the Coca-Cola Bottling Company. George Hunter was the heir of Benjamin Thomas, and much of the wealth related to the Coca-Cola Bottling Company passed on to the Foundation. As of 2004 The Benwood Foundation distributes between $4 and $5 million annually in grants and donations.

History 

Upon George Hunter's death in 1950, 70 percent of the Coca-Cola Bottling Company stock went to the Foundation. This led to a probate law precedent-setting lawsuit when family members sued regarding the tax status of the donation. A 1952 court ruling stated that the Foundation did not have to pay death duties, which became the responsibility of the residuary estate. The ruling was upheld on appeal.

Focus 

The Foundation's grantmaking focus is on Public Education, Arts & Culture, the Environment, and Neighborhood & Community Development.

See also

 Benjamin Thomas
 George Hunter

External links
 The Benwood Foundation Website

References 

Foundations based in the United States
Organizations established in 1944
Organizations based in Tennessee
Coca-Cola